Logology may refer to:

Logology (linguistics) in recreational linguistics is a wide variety of word games and wordplay
Logology (science), the study of all things related to science
Logology (theology), the study of words in search for divine truth
Lexicology, the study of word meaning and function